Porocephalidae is a family of crustaceans belonging to the order Porocephalida.

Genera:
 Armillifer Sambon, 1922
 Cubirea Kishida, 1928
 Elenia Heymons, 1932
 Gigliolella Chabaud & Choquet, 1954
 Kiricephalus Sambon, 1922
 Parasambonia Stunkard & Gandal, 1968
 Polystoma 2020
 Porocephalus Humboldt, 1812
 Waddycephalus Sambon, 1922

References

Crustaceans